Yuxarı Çaykənd (before 1991 Barum) is a village and municipality in the Shamkir Rayon of Azerbaijan.  It has a population of 225.

References 

Populated places in Shamkir District